Nerdcore Rising is a documentary/concert film starring MC Frontalot and other nerdcore hip hop artists such as mc chris, Wheelie Cyberman of Optimus Rhyme and MC Lars, with contributors from artists such as "Weird Al" Yankovic, Prince Paul, and Brian Posehn.
The film, directed and produced by Negin Farsad, was premiered at the 2008 South by Southwest festival in Austin, Texas. It combines interviews about nerdcore and its origins with footage of MC Frontalot's 2006 Nerdcore Rising national tour.

Film content 
The film investigates the nerdcore genre of hip-hop music, following the godfather of the genre, MC Frontalot, on his first national tour.
Beginning in South Carolina and culminating at the Penny Arcade Expo in Seattle, masses of fans across the country come out to hear Frontalot's music as he strives to achieve mainstream success.

Behind the scenes, relationships among Frontalot and his band are challenged by their experiences on the road. Frontalot and keyboard player Gaby Alter, a.k.a. G Minor 7, are childhood friends, and both met bass guitarist Brandon Patton, a.k.a. Blak Lotus, in college. Strugis, the drummer, tries to fit in as the new member and Brandon, the so-called flirt of the band, is a taskmaster in Sturgis.

Throughout the film, music industry notables provide insight into Nerdcore. Old school trailblazers like Prince Paul and contemporary hip hop aficionados like J-Live examine the legitimacy of nerdcore as a subgenre of hip hop. Celebrities like "Weird Al" Yankovic discuss the origins of nerdcore while Penny Arcade creators Mike Krahulik and Jerry Holkins expound on the digital revolution that is enabling the nerdcore movement.

MC Frontalot strives to live in a world where nerdcore is a real genre of hip-hop and where other MCs take him seriously.

DVD release 
The DVD of Nerdcore Rising was sold in limited release in August 2008. It was sold for the first time at the 2008 Penny Arcade Expo in Seattle. It was released widely on 15 September 2009.

References

External links
 
 
 

2008 films
American documentary films
Documentary films about hip hop music and musicians
Nerdcore
2000s English-language films
2000s American films